Lenino is a rural locality (a village) in Chekmagushevsky District, Bashkortostan, Russia. The population was 130 as of 2010. There is 1 street.

Geography 
Lenino is located 19 km southwest of Chekmagush (the district's administrative centre) by road. Novobaltachevo is the nearest rural locality.

References 

Rural localities in Chekmagushevsky District